John Edward Hegarty (June 9, 1888 – March 1, 1974) was an American football player and coach of football and basketball.  He served as the head football coach at North Carolina College of Agriculture and Mechanic Arts, now North Carolina State University, from 1914 to 1915, compiling a record of 5–6–2.  Hegarty also coached basketball for a season at North Carolina A&M in 1913–14, tallying a mark of 6–7.  He was also the head coach of the Washington Senators, who played three games in the National Football League in 1921. Before becoming a coach, Hegarty played college football at Georgetown University from 1910 until 1912.

Head coaching record

College football

NFL

† - Does not include the forfeit by the Rochester Jeffersons that is not officially recognized by the NFL. Also does not include their 7–4 record in non-APFA games.

References

External links
 

1888 births
1974 deaths
American football ends
Georgetown Hoyas football players
NC State Wolfpack football coaches
NC State Wolfpack men's basketball coaches
Washington Senators (NFL)
Burials at Arlington National Cemetery